Gessler or Geßler is a German surname. Notable people with the surname include:

Albrecht Gessler, 14th century Austrian bailiff connected with the William Tell legend
Amaka Gessler (born 1990), New Zealand swimmer
Friedrich Leopold von Geßler (1688–1762), Prussian field marshal
Doc Gessler (1880–1924), American baseball player
Otto Gessler (1875–1955), German politician
Scott Gessler (born 1965), American lawyer and Secretary of State of the U.S. State of Colorado

See also
 113355 Gessler, asteroid
 Gessler Clinic, P.A., a large outpatient clinic system in Winter Haven, Florida

German-language surnames